Babelabad (also Romanized as Bābelābād) is a village in Hajjilar-e Jonubi Rural District, Hajjilar District, Chaypareh County, West Azerbaijan Province, Iran. At the 2006 census, its population was 1,164, in 242 families.

References 

Populated places in Chaypareh County